The Itaú River (Spanish, Río Itaú) is a river of Argentina and Bolivia. It is a tributary of the Río Grande de Tarija.

See also
List of rivers of Argentina
List of rivers of Bolivia

References

 Rand McNally, The New International Atlas, 1993.

Rivers of Argentina
Rivers of Bolivia
Tributaries of the Paraguay River
Rivers of Tarija Department
Rivers of Salta Province
International rivers of South America